Wally Peterson (October 11, 1917 – March 30, 2011) was an American actor, singer, songwriter and stage manager.

Biography
A frequent performer and producer on Broadway, Peterson was also known for his West End performances in the London productions of Oklahoma! and South Pacific.

Peterson was married to the Australian performer Joy Nichols from 1949 until the mid-1970s, when they divorced. They had three children: two daughters and a son. Peterson died in New York City on March 30, 2011 at the age of 93.

References

External links

1917 births
2011 deaths
American male musical theatre actors
American baritones
New England Conservatory alumni
Musicians from Boston